Colobothea ramosa is a species of beetle in the family Cerambycidae. It was described by Bates in 1872. It is known from Mexico and Nicaragua.

References

ramosa
Beetles described in 1872
Beetles of South America